Mary Eleanor Laffoy, SC (born 17 June 1945) is a retired Irish judge who is currently President of the Law Reform Commission. She previously served as a Judge of the Supreme Court from 2013 to 2017, and a Judge of the High Court from 1995 to 2013. She chaired the Citizens' Assembly between 2016 and 2018.

Early life

Laffoy was born on North Circular Road, Dublin, moving to Manorhamilton and Swinford, before returning to Dublin to live in Donabate following the death of her father. She attended Tourmakeady College in Toormakeady.

Initially after leaving school she tried primary school teaching at Carysfort College and joined the civil service. She was subsequently educated at University College Dublin and King's Inns. She received the John Brooks Scholarship at the Inns for achieving the highest marks. She received a BA from UCD in 1968 and a BCL in 1971.

Legal career 

She was called to the Bar in 1971 and to the Inner Bar in 1987. She devilled for Brian McCracken. She became a Senior Counsel on the same day as future Supreme Court colleagues Susan Denham and Liam McKechnie and at the time was only one of four women seniors.

Her expertise at the Bar was in property law. She appeared in the Cityview Press case which clarified the law on the nondelegation doctrine in Ireland. In 1983, she was appointed by the Supreme Court to argue against the constitutionality of the Electoral (Amendment) Bill 1983 following a reference made by President Patrick Hillery under Article 26 of the Constitution of Ireland. She appeared in another Article 26 reference made by Mary Robinson regarding the Matrimonial Home Bill 1993. For both references, the Supreme Court found for her side.

In 1986, she appeared on The Late Late Show in a simulated court case to argue for a vote against the Fifteenth Amendment of the Constitution of Ireland.

Judicial career

High Court 

She was appointed as a judge of the High Court in 1995. She primarily presided over cases involving chancery law.

She presided over the Commission to Inquire into Child Abuse from 1999 to 2003, an inquiry into child abuse. Her decision to resign as chair before the commission completed its report was controversial. In her letter of resignation from the commission of 2 September 2003, Laffoy outlined her belief that the actions of the Government and the Department of Education had frustrated her efforts and had slowed the commission's work. She felt that: "...the cumulative effect of those factors effectively negated the guarantee of independence conferred on the Commission and militated against it being able to perform its statutory functions." The commission was chaired from 2003 to 2009 by Judge Sean Ryan.

She presided over the High Court hearing in A v Governor of Arbour Hill Prison, ordering the release of a prisoner convicted of statutory rape due an earlier finding that the offence he was convicted of was contrary to the Constitution of Ireland. Her decision was overturned on appeal to the Supreme Court. In 2012, she dismissed an action taken by Thomas Pringle regarding the legality of the European Stability Mechanism. The European Court of Justice, after reference from the Supreme Court, also rejected his claim.

During her time at the High Court, ten percent of reported judgments were written by Laffoy.

Supreme Court 

Laffoy was appointed to the Supreme Court of Ireland in July 2013. She retired from the Supreme Court on 16 June 2017. A portrait of her was unveiled in the King's Inns in March 2020.

Additional appointments

Citizens' Assembly 

In July 2016, she was appointed by Taoiseach Enda Kenny to chair the Citizens' Assembly, which she chaired until June 2018.

Law Reform Commission 

She became the president of the Law Reform Commission in 2018.

References

1945 births
20th-century Irish people
21st-century Irish people
Living people
Alumni of University College Dublin
Irish barristers
Irish Senior Counsel
Judges of the Supreme Court of Ireland
Irish women judges
High Court judges (Ireland)
Irish women lawyers
Alumni of King's Inns